Kankakee Community College (KCC) is a public community college in Kankakee, Illinois. The main campus is located on the southern border of the city of Kankakee and spans  along the banks of the Kankakee River. KCC is accredited by the Commission on Institutions of Higher Education of the North Central Association of Colleges. The college was founded in 1966. Its president is Michael Boyd.

The college offered its first classes in September 1968. Since that date, it has served as an educational, vocational, and recreational center for residents of Community College District 520, an area encompassing all or part of Kankakee, Iroquois, Ford, Grundy, Livingston, and Will counties. The school serves a population of approximately 150,000.

Notable alumni
 Michael Clarke Duncan (1957-2012), Oscar-nominated actor (Green Mile, Whole Nine Yards, Scorpion King); KCC student and basketball player from 1979 to 1981
 Charles Pangle (1941-2015), Illinois state representative
 Tom Prince, catcher for five Major League Baseball teams
 LaMont "ShowBoat" Robinson (born 1961) Played oversea Denmark (1886–87) USBL (1988) Meadowlark Lemon Harlem-All-Star (1988-1995) Harlem Globetotters and Washington Generals Tour (1989) Harlem Road Kings (1995-2010) Harlem Clowns (2010-Present) KCC student and basketball player (1981–82) Central State Univ (1986) Founder of the Rhythm & Blues Hall of Fame.

References

External links
 Official website

Community colleges in Illinois
Educational institutions established in 1966
1966 establishments in Illinois
NJCAA athletics